The Mundo Maya Open was a men's professional golf tournament held in Mexico on PGA Tour Latinoamérica. 

The tournament was the inaugural event on PGA Tour Latinoamérica when it was first hosted in 2012 and has been hosted on the Jack Nicklaus designed El Jaguar course at the Yucatán Country Club since its inception. The inaugural winner for the event was Tommy Cocha with an aggregate score of a 266 which remains a tournament record.

Winners

References

PGA Tour Latinoamérica events
Golf tournaments in Mexico
Sport in Yucatán
Recurring sporting events established in 2012
Recurring sporting events disestablished in 2015
2012 establishments in Mexico
2015 disestablishments in Mexico